John Armstrong was an Irish politician.

Armstrong was born in County Tipperary and educated at Trinity College, Dublin. He was MP for Fore in County Westmeath from 1769 to 1776; and for Kilmallock in County Limerick from 1783 to 1792.

References

People from County Tipperary
Irish MPs 1769–1776
Irish MPs 1783–1790
Irish MPs 1790–1797
Alumni of Trinity College Dublin